Markell is a given name and a surname. Notable people with the name include:

Surname
Duke Markell, baseball pitcher
Henry Markell, American lawyer and politician
Jack Markell, American businessman and politician
Jodie Markell, American actress and film director
Patchen Markell, American political scientist

Given name
Markell Carter, American football linebacker
Markell Jones, American football running back

See also
Markelle
Markel (name)